The 1871 Westmeath by-election was fought on 17 June 1871.  The byelection was fought due to the Death of the incumbent MP of the Liberal Party, William Pollard-Urquhart.  It was won by the Home Rule candidate Patrick James Smyth, who was unopposed.  The gain was retained at the 1874 general election.

References

By-elections to the Parliament of the United Kingdom in County Westmeath constituencies
1871 elections in the United Kingdom
Unopposed by-elections to the Parliament of the United Kingdom (need citation)
1871 elections in Ireland